Good Dog is a Canadian television comedy-drama series which aired for one season on HBO Canada.  The show follows the life of character George Findlay, a role that Ken Finkleman reprised from The Newsroom.

Overview
George Findlay (Finkleman) is a character who has been present in virtually all of Finkleman's past television projects, including The Newsroom, More Tears, Foolish Heart and Foreign Objects. A self-centred and unsympathetic television producer, in Good Dog he is trying to launch a reality show about his life with his new, much younger girlfriend Claire (Lauren Lee Smith).

The series was initially renewed for a ten-episode second season, with a retooled storyline focusing on cable news. However, this season was instead retitled as a new program titled Good God.

Episodes

References

External links

 
 HBO Canada's Good Dog page

2010s Canadian comedy-drama television series
2011 Canadian television series debuts
2011 Canadian television series endings
2010s Canadian satirical television series
Television shows set in Toronto
Television shows filmed in Toronto
Television series by Shaftesbury Films
Crave original programming
Television series created by Ken Finkleman